The Florida Mr. Football Award is an honor given to the top high school football player in the state of Florida. Awarded by Dairy Farmers, Inc. and the Florida Athletic Coaches Association, many past winners have proceeded to have successful college careers and play in the National Football League.

Award winners
Professional teams listed are teams known.

References

 
 
  

High school sports in Florida
Mr. Football awards